Hilda Augusta Amanda Kerfstedt, née Hallström (5 June 1835, in Eskilstuna – 10 April 1920, in Stockholm), was a Swedish novelist, playwright and translator. She was a popular and noted writer in late 19th and early 20th century Sweden, and participated in the public debate. She was also engaged in the movement for women's rights, and active in the Fredrika Bremer Association and Married Woman's Property Rights Association. As a feminist, she focused on the debate around sexual equality, and was critical to the contemporary sexual double standards for men and women. As such, she was one of the participants in the Nordic sexual morality debate, the public debate in Swedish papers, books and plays, which took place during the 1880s. Kerfstedt was a member of the women's association Nya Idun and one of its first committee members. She was the editor of the feminist paper Dagny, the publication of the Fredrika Bremer Association, in 1888–1891. She was especially noted within the debate on children's literature.

Early and personal life
Kerfstedt was born to Sven August Hallström, mayor of Eskilstuna, and Albertina Dybeck, and was the maternal niece to scientist Richard Dybeck. She married Hedemora parish vicar Bengt Gustaf Lindgren (d. 1858) in 1855, and Petrus Kerfstedt (d. 1906), principal at the Tomteboda institute for the blind, in 1872. She had two children; her son Hellen Lindgren became a well known literary critic.

Works
 
 
 
 
 
 
 
 
 
 
 Contains the author's , originally published in Finsk Tidskrift in 1881.

Children's literature

References

Further reading 
 

1835 births
1920 deaths
19th-century Swedish women writers
19th-century Swedish dramatists and playwrights
19th-century translators
Swedish translators
Swedish women's rights activists
Swedish women dramatists and playwrights
Members of Nya Idun